Tony César Gómez (Cerro Largo, Uruguay, born April 23, 1967) is a former Uruguayan footballer. He played as right back or defensive midfielder. In 1988, he scored the last penalty in the penalty round winning Nacional their third Copa Intercontinental. He played for teams in Uruguay (Club Nacional de Football, Club Atletico River Plate, Montevideo Wanderers, Plaza Colonia), Argentina (San Lorenzo de Almagro, Club Atlético Independiente, Estudiantes de La Plata), Barcelona Sporting Club in Ecuador and finally Guangzhou Matsunichi in China.

He also played for the Uruguay national team in the Copa América 1997 and the 1998 FIFA World Cup qualifiers.

Honours

National tournaments

International tournaments

External links
 Tony Gómez en Nacionaldigital.com

1967 births
Living people
Uruguayan footballers
Uruguayan expatriate footballers
Uruguay international footballers
People from Cerro Largo Department
Club Nacional de Football players
Club Atlético River Plate (Montevideo) players
Montevideo Wanderers F.C. players
Plaza Colonia players
Barcelona S.C. footballers
Santiago Wanderers footballers
Primera B de Chile players
Uruguayan Primera División players
Expatriate footballers in Chile
Expatriate footballers in Argentina
Expatriate footballers in Ecuador
Association football fullbacks